The Days Between is a 2001 German drama film about a young woman in Berlin. It was directed by Maria Speth.

References

External links 

2001 films
2001 drama films
German drama films
2000s German-language films
Films set in Berlin
2000s German films